Xylosma proctorii is a species of flowering plant in the family Salicaceae. It is endemic to Jamaica.

References

proctorii
Vulnerable plants
Endemic flora of Jamaica
Taxa named by Hermann Otto Sleumer
Taxonomy articles created by Polbot